Vernor is a rural locality in the Somerset Region, Queensland, Australia.

History 

Vernor takes its name from its former railway station, named after selector Robert Vernor, who took up Portion 39A parish of Burnett on 15 July 1868. Vernor was a soldier who had served in the Connaught Rangers in the British Army.

In the 1893 floods the Vernor family was initially unconcerned as they had not had difficulty in copy with the 1890 floods. However as the flood waters rose, Vernor rowed the eight people in his household to the stables in the belief that the loft in the stables would remain after the flood waters. However, the flood water rose so that they were not safe in the loft and Vernor rowed them to a tree where they tried to their boat to the tree hoping to ride out the flood in the boat. However, the flood was too powerful and they could not make fast to the tree so their boat was carried down out of their control down the river until it crashed into the upper branches of a gum tree, leaving the household struggling in the water, until some of them managed to climb onto the tree. They then proceeded to climb into higher and higher branches of the tree as the waters rose, ripping their clothing to twist into ropes to help them climb. They spent nearly a day and a half in the top of the tree until neighbours were able to rescue them in a boat. 

In the  Vernor had a population of 279 people.

References

External links

Suburbs of Somerset Region
Localities in Queensland